Peter Wood may refer to:

 Peter Atte Wode (fl. c. 1325–1382), English justice
 Pete Wood (1867–1923), Canadian-American Major League Baseball pitcher
 Peter Wood (director) (1925–2016), English theatre director
 Peter Hill-Wood (1936-2018), English businessman
 Sir Peter Wood (born c. 1946), founder of insurance companies Direct Line and Esure
 Peter Wood, Australian businessman and founding partner G. Wood, Son & Co.
 Peter H. Wood (born 1943), American historian and author
 Peter K. Wood (born 1984), American entertainer and magician
 Peter Wood (politician) (1935–2010), member of the Queensland Legislative Assembly
 Peter Wood (footballer, born 1946), Australian rules football player for Fitzroy
 Peter Wood (footballer, born 1939), Australian rules football player for Footscray
 Peter Wood (cricketer) (born 1951), English cricketer
 Peter W. Wood, American anthropologist; president of the National Association of Scholars

See also
 "Peter's Got Woods", Family Guy episode
 Peter Woods (disambiguation)
 Peter Van Wood (1927–2010), Dutch guitarist, singer, songwriter, actor and astrologer